The 1987 Transkei coup d'état was a bloodless military coup in Transkei, an unrecognised state and a nominally independent South African homeland for the Xhosa people, which took place on 30 December 1987. The coup was led by the then 32-year-old Major General Bantu Holomisa, the Chief of the Transkei Defence Force, against the government of Prime Minister Stella Sigcau (TNIP). Holomisa suspended the civilian constitution and refused South Africa's repeated demands for a return to civilian rule on the grounds that a civilian government would be a puppet controlled by Pretoria.

A counter-coup staged in 1990 failed, and Holomisa's military government stayed in power until the reunification of Transkei with South Africa in 1994, after the first post-apartheid general election.

The Military Rule Medal was instituted to commemorate the 1987 coup d'état. While the medal is known to have been instituted and awarded, no warrant has yet been traced.

See also 
 1990 Ciskei coup d'état
 1990 Venda coup d'état
 1994 Bophuthatswana crisis

References 

Military coups in Transkei
Politics of Transkei
1987 in South Africa
December 1987 events in Africa
1980s coups d'état and coup attempts